Samantha Molina may refer to:

 Samantha Molina (born 1982), Italian rower.
 Samantha Molina Rodriguez (born 1994), Peruvian cyclist.